Erik Andersen (born 28 July 1937) is a Norwegian politician for the Progress Party.

He served as a deputy representative to the Parliament of Norway from Vestfold during the terms 1989–1993, 1993–1997 and 2001–2005. In total he met during 32 days of parliamentary session.

References

1937 births
Living people
Progress Party (Norway) politicians
Deputy members of the Storting
Vestfold politicians
Place of birth missing (living people)
20th-century Norwegian politicians